The 1987 Ole Miss Rebels football team represented the University of Mississippi in the sport of American football during the 1987 NCAA Division I-A football season. The Rebels won 3 games and lost 8. Star players included Mark Young and Willie Green. The team beat Arkansas State,  Southwestern Louisiana, and  Vanderbilt. The team was hit with a bowl ban after 1986.

Schedule

Roster

References 

Ole Miss
Ole Miss Rebels football seasons
Ole Miss Rebels football